Tata Motors Limited is an Indian multinational automotive manufacturing company, headquartered in Mumbai, India, which is part of the Tata Group. The company produces passenger cars, trucks, vans, coaches, buses.

Formerly known as Tata Engineering and Locomotive Company (TELCO), the company was founded in 1945 as a manufacturer of locomotives. The company manufactured its first commercial vehicle in 1954 in a collaboration with Daimler-Benz AG, which ended in 1969. Tata Motors entered the passenger vehicle market in 1988 with the launch of the TataMobile followed by the Tata Sierra in 1991, becoming the first Indian manufacturer to achieve the capability of developing a competitive indigenous automobile. In 1998, Tata launched the first fully indigenous Indian passenger car, the Indica, and in 2008 launched the Tata Nano, the world's most affordable car. Tata Motors acquired the South Korean truck manufacturer Daewoo Commercial Vehicles Company in 2004. Tata Motors has been the parent company of Jaguar Land Rover since the company established it for the acquisition of Jaguar Cars and Land Rover from Ford in 2008.

Tata Motors' principal subsidiaries include British premium car maker Jaguar Land Rover (the maker of Jaguar and Land Rover cars) and the South Korean commercial vehicle manufacturer Tata Daewoo. Tata Motors has a construction-equipment manufacturing joint venture with Hitachi (Tata Hitachi Construction Machinery), and a joint venture with Stellantis which manufactures automotive components and Fiat Chrysler and Tata branded vehicles. On 12 October 2021, private equity firm TPG invested $1 billion in Tata Motors' electric vehicle subsidiary.

Tata Motors has auto manufacturing and vehicle plants in Jamshedpur, Pantnagar, Lucknow, Sanand, Dharwad, and Pune in India, as well as in Argentina, South Africa, the United Kingdom, and Thailand. It has research and development centres in Pune, Jamshedpur, Lucknow, Dharwad, India and South Korea, the United Kingdom, and Spain.  Tata Motors is listed on the BSE (Bombay Stock Exchange), where it is a constituent of the BSE SENSEX index, the National Stock Exchange of India, and the New York Stock Exchange. The company is ranked 265th on the Fortune Global 500 list of the world's biggest corporations as of 2019.

On 17 January 2017, Natarajan Chandrasekaran was appointed chairman of the company Tata Group. Tata Motors increased its UV market share to over 8% in FY2019.

History

Tata Motors was founded in 1945, as a locomotive manufacturer. Tata Group entered the commercial vehicle sector in 1954 after forming a joint venture with Daimler-Benz of Germany. After years of dominating the commercial vehicle market in India, Tata Motors entered the passenger vehicle market in 1991 by launching the Tata Sierra, a sport utility vehicle based on the Tata Mobile platform. Tata subsequently launched the Tata Estate (1992; a station wagon design based on the earlier Tata Mobile), the Tata Sumo (1994, a 5-door SUV) and the Tata Safari (1998).

Tata launched the Indica in 1998, a fully indigenous Indian passenger car tailor-made to suit Indian consumer needs though styled by I.D.E.A, Italy. Although initially criticized by auto analysts, its excellent fuel economy, powerful engine, and aggressive marketing strategy made it one of the best-selling cars in the history of the Indian automobile industry. A newer version of the car, named Indica V2, was a major improvement over the previous version and quickly became a mass favorite. Tata Motors also successfully exported large numbers of car to South Africa. The success of the Indica played a key role in the growth of Tata Motors.

In 2004, Tata Motors acquired Daewoo's South Korea-based truck manufacturing unit, Daewoo Commercial Vehicles Company, later renamed Tata Daewoo.

On 27 September 2004, Ratan Tata, the Chairman of Tata Motors, rang the opening bell at the New York Stock Exchange to mark the listing of Tata Motors.

In 2005, Tata Motors acquired a 21% controlling stake in the Spanish bus and coach manufacturer Hispano Carrocera. Tata Motors continued its market area expansion through the introduction of new products such as buses (Starbus and Globus, jointly developed with subsidiary Hispano Carrocera) and trucks (Novus, jointly developed with subsidiary Tata Daewoo).

In 2006, Tata formed a joint venture with the Brazil-based Marcopolo, Tata Marcopolo Bus, to manufacture fully built buses and coaches.

In 2008, Tata Motors acquired the English car maker Jaguar Land Rover, manufacturer of the Jaguar and Land Rover from Ford Motor Company.

In April 2022, Tata AVINYA Concept:A NEW PARADIGM OF INNOVATION;

Tata acquired full ownership of Hispano Carrocera in 2009.

In 2009, its Lucknow plant was awarded the "Best of All" Rajiv Gandhi National Quality Award.

In 2010, Tata Motors acquired an 80% stake in the Italian design and engineering company Trilix for €1.85 million. The acquisition formed part of the company's plan to enhance its styling and design capabilities.

In 2012, Tata Motors announced it would invest around 6 billion in the development of Futuristic Infantry Combat Vehicles in collaboration with DRDO.

In 2013, Tata Motors announced it will sell in India, the first vehicle in the world to run on compressed air (engines designed by the French company MDI) and dubbed "Mini CAT".

In 2014, Tata Motors introduced the first Truck Racing championship in India "T1 Prima Truck Racing Championship".

On 26 January 2014, the Managing Director Karl Slym was found dead. He fell from the 22nd floor to the fourth floor of the Shangri-La Hotel in Bangkok, where he was to attend a meeting of Tata Motors Thailand.

On 2 November 2015, Tata Motors announced Lionel Messi as global brand ambassador at New Delhi, to promote and endorse passenger vehicles globally.

On 27 December 2016, Tata Motors announced the Bollywood actor Akshay Kumar as brand ambassador for its commercial vehicles range.

On 8 March 2017, Tata Motors announced that it has signed a memorandum of understanding with Volkswagen to develop vehicles for India's domestic market.

On 3 May 2018, Tata Motors announced that it sold its aerospace and defence business to another Tata Group Entity, Tata Advanced Systems, to unlock their full potential.

On 29 April 2019, Tata Motors announced a partnership with Nirma University in Ahmedabad to provide a B.Tech. degree programme for employees of its Sanand plant.

On 24 March 2020, Tata Motors Ltd announced that it would spin off its passenger vehicles arm as a separate unit within the company.

On 5 March 2021, Tata Motors' shareholders approved hiving off its passenger vehicles business into a separate entity.
 
In August 2021, as a complimentary reward for Indian Olympians who finished close fourth in Tokyo Olympics 2021 and missed the place for Bronze, the company planned to recognize the efforts by gifting an Altroz hatchback.

On 23 August 2021 Tata Motors announced it will launch its mini SUV Punch in the ongoing festive season.

On 30 May 2022 Tata Motors announced that it has signed an agreement to acquire a Ford India manufacturing plant in Sanand, Gujarat. Tata Motors agreed to pay 7.26bn rupees ($91.5m) for the manufacturing plant.

In March 2023 Tata Motors had a Market cap of Rs. 1,48,866 crore.

Operations
Tata Motors has vehicle assembly operations in India, the United Kingdom, South Korea, Thailand, Spain, and South Africa(Formerly). It plans to establish plants in Turkey, Indonesia, and Eastern Europe.

Tata Motors Cars

Tata Motors Cars is a division of Tata Motors which produces passenger cars under the Tata Motors hood. Tata Motors is among the top five passenger vehicle brands in India with products in the compact, midsize car, and utility vehicle segments. The company's manufacturing base in India is spread across Jamshedpur (Jharkhand), Pune (Maharashtra), Lucknow (Uttar Pradesh), Pantnagar (Uttarakhand), Dharwad (Karnataka) and Sanand (Gujarat). Tata's dealership, sales, service, and spare parts network comprise over 3,500 touchpoints. Tata Motors has more than 250 dealerships in more than 195 cities across 27 states and four Union Territories of India. It has the third-largest sales and service network after Maruti Suzuki and Hyundai.

Tata also has franchisee/joint venture assembly operations in Kenya, Bangladesh, Ukraine, Russia, and Senegal. Tata has dealerships in 26 countries across 4 continents. Tata is present in many countries, it has managed to create a large consumer base in the Indian subcontinent, namely India, Bangladesh, Bhutan, Sri Lanka and Nepal. Tata is also present in Italy, Spain, Poland, Romania, Turkey, Chile, South Africa, Oman, Kuwait, Qatar, Saudi Arabia, United Arab Emirates, Bahrain, Iraq, Syria and Australia.

Tata Daewoo

Tata Daewoo (officially Tata Daewoo Commercial Vehicle Company and formerly Daewoo Commercial Vehicle Company) is a commercial vehicle manufacturer headquartered in Gunsan, Jeollabuk-do South Korea, and a wholly owned subsidiary of Tata Motors. It is the second-largest heavy commercial vehicle manufacturer in South Korea and was acquired by Tata Motors in 2004. The principal reasons behind the acquisition were to reduce Tata's dependence on the Indian commercial vehicle market (which was responsible for around 94% of its sales in the MHCV segment and around 84% in the light commercial vehicle segment) and expand its product portfolio by leveraging on Daewoo's strengths in the heavy-tonnage sector.

Tata Motors has jointly worked with Tata Daewoo to develop trucks such as Novus and World Truck and buses including GloBus and StarBus. In 2012, Tata began developing a new line to manufacture competitive and fuel-efficient commercial vehicles to face the competition posed by the entry of international brands such as Mercedes-Benz, Volvo, and Navistar into the Indian market.

Tata Hispano

Tata Hispano Motors Carrocera, S.A. was a bus and coach manufacturer based in Zaragoza, Aragon, Spain, and a wholly owned subsidiary of Tata Motors. Tata Hispano has plants in Zaragoza, Spain, and Casablanca, Morocco. Tata Motors first acquired a 21% stake in Hispano Carrocera SA in 2005, and purchased the remaining 79% for an undisclosed sum in 2009, making it a fully owned subsidiary, subsequently renamed Tata Hispano. In 2013, Tata Hispano ceased production at its Zaragoza plant.

Jaguar Land Rover

Jaguar Land Rover PLC is a premium British automaker headquartered in Whitley, Coventry, United Kingdom, and has been a wholly owned subsidiary of Tata Motors since June 2008, when it was acquired from Ford Motor Company of USA. Its principal activity is the development, manufacture and sale of Jaguar luxury and sports cars and Land Rover premium four-wheel-drive vehicles.

Jaguar Land Rover has two design centres and three assembly plants in the United Kingdom. Under Tata ownership, Jaguar Land Rover has launched new vehicles including the Range Rover Evoque, Jaguar F-Type, the Jaguar XE, the Jaguar XJ (X351), the second-generation Range Rover Sport, and Jaguar XF, the fourth-generation Land Rover Discovery, Range Rover Velar  and the Range Rover (L405).

JD Power, of the US, rates Land Rover and Jaguar as the two worst brands for initial quality.
 The Jaguar F-Pace made Consumer Reports February 2019 list of the 10 Least Reliable Cars. The editors cited "electronics, drive system, power equipment, noises and leaks" as problematic aspects.
   
The Jaguar Land Rover subsidiary was struggling by 2019 and Tata Motors wrote down its investment in JLR by $3.9 billion. Much of the financial problem was due to a 50% drop in sales in China during 2019, although the situation was improving. Still, Tata was open to considering a partnership with another company according to a statement in mid-October, as long as the partnership agreement would allow Tata to maintain control of the business. The company ruled out the possibility of a sale of JLR to another entity.

TML Drivelines
TML Drivelines Ltd. is a wholly owned subsidiary of Tata Motors engaged in the manufacture of gearboxes and axles for heavy and medium commercial vehicles. It has production facilities at Jamshedpur and Lucknow.  TML Forge division is also a recent acquisition of TML Drivelines. TML Drivelines was formed through the merger of HV Transmission  and HV Axles .

Tata Technologies
Tata Technologies Limited (TTL) is a 43%-owned subsidiary of Tata Motors which provides design, engineering, and business process outsourcing services to the automotive industry. It is headquartered in Pune's Hinjawadi business district and also has operations in London, Detroit and Thailand. Its clients include Ford, General Motors, Honda, and Toyota.

The British engineering and design services company Incat International, which specialises in engineering and design services and product lifecycle management in the automotive, aerospace, and engineering sectors, is a wholly owned subsidiary of TTL. It was acquired by TTL in August 2005 for 4 billion.

In 2017, TAL, a subsidiary of Tata Motors, manufactured India's first industrial articulated robot for micro, small, and medium enterprises.

European Technical Centre
The Tata Motors European Technical Centre (TMETC) is an automotive design, engineering, and research company based at WMG, University of Warwick on the campus of the University of Warwick in England. It was established in 2005 and is a wholly owned subsidiary of Tata Motors. It was the joint developer of the World Truck.

In September 2013, it was announced that a new National Automotive Innovation Campus would be built at WMG at Warwick's main campus at a cost of £100 million. The initiative will be a partnership between Tata Motors, the university, and Jaguar Land Rover, with £30 million in funding coming from Tata Motors.

Joint ventures

Tata Marcopolo

Tata Marcopolo is a bus-manufacturing joint venture between Tata Motors (51%) and the Brazil-based Marcopolo S.A. (49%). The joint venture manufactures and assembles fully built buses and coaches targeted at developing mass rapid transportation systems. It uses technology and expertise in chassis and aggregates from Tata Motors, and know-how in processes and systems for bodybuilding and bus body design from Marcopolo. Tata Marcopolo has launched a low-floor city bus which is widely used by transport corporations in many Indian cities. Its manufacturing facility is based in Dharwad, Karnataka State, India and Lucknow, India.

Tata Motors is expected to buy the 49% stake held by its partner Marcopolo in the bus-making joint venture for ₹100 crore by February 2021. The subsidiary will continue with the ‘Marcopolo’ trademark for a minimum of three years with a non-compete provision in India for a corresponding period.

Fiat-Tata
Fiat-Tata is an India-based joint venture between Tata and Stellantis' Fiat which produces Fiat and Tata branded passenger cars, as well as engines and transmissions. Tata Motors has gained access to Fiat's diesel engine and transmission technology through the joint venture.

The two companies formerly also had a distribution joint venture through which Fiat products were sold in India through joint Tata-Fiat dealerships. This distribution arrangement was ended in March 2013; Fiats have since been distributed in India by Fiat Automobiles India Limited, a wholly owned subsidiary of Fiat and now Tata Motors.

Tata Hitachi Construction Machinery

Tata Hitachi Construction Machinery is a joint venture between Tata Motors and Hitachi which manufactures excavators and other construction equipment. It was previously known as Telcon Construction Solutions.

Tata Motors European Technical Centre
The TATA Motors European Technical Centre is an automotive design, engineering, and research company. Company based at WMG, University of Warwick in the United Kingdom. It was established in 2005 and is wholly owned subsidiary of Tata Motors. It was the joint developer of the World Truck. In September 2013 it was announced that a new National Automotive Innovative Campus would be built at WMG at Warwick's main campus at a cost of 92 million pounds. The initiative will be a partnership between Tata Motors, the university, and Jaguar Land Rover, with the 30 million pounds in funding coming from Tata Motors.

Hyundai-Tata
Tata Motors and Hyundai are in a joint venture to provide  the automatic transmission for Tata Harrier model.

Products
For details of Land Rover and Jaguar products, see Jaguar Land Rover.

Passenger vehicles

Current Models

Commercial vehicles
 Tata Ace
 Tata Ace Zip
 Tata Ace EV
 Tata Super Ace
 Tata Intra
 Tata Invtra V 10
 Tata Invtra V 20
 Tata Invtra V 30
 Tata Invtra V 50
 Tata Xenon XT
 Tata Yodha
 Tata Ace Mega
 Tata Iris
 Tata TL/Telcoline/207 Pick-up truck
 Tata 407 Ex and Ex2
 Tata 709 Ex
 Tata 807 (Steel cabin chassis, cowl chassis, medium bus chassis, steel cabin + steel body chassis)
 Tata 809 Ex and Ex2
 Tata 909 Ex and Ex2
 Tata 1210 SE and SFC (Semi Forward)
 Tata 1210 LP (Long Plate)
 Tata 1109 (Intermediate truck/ LCV bus)
 Tata 1512c (Medium bus chassis)
 Tata 1515c/1615 (Medium bus chassis)
 Tata 1612c/1616c/1618c (Heavy bus chassis)
 Tata 1618 (Semilow-floor bus chassis)
 Tata 1623 (Rear-engined low-floor bus chassis)
 Tata 1518C (Medium truck) 10 ton
 Tata 1613/1615c (Medium truck)
 Tata 1616/1618c (Heavy duty truck)
 Tata 2515c/2516c/2518c (Heavy duty 10-wheeler truck)
 Tata Starbus (Branded buses for city, intercity, school bus, and standard passenger transportation)
 Tata Divo (Hispano Divo)
 Tata CityRide (12- to 20-seater buses for intracity use)
 Tata 3015 (Heavy truck)
 Tata 3118 (Heavy truck) (8×2)
 Tata 3516 (Heavy truck)
 Tata 4018 (Heavy truck)
 Tata 4923 (Ultraheavy truck) (6×4)
 Tata Novus
 Tata Prima
 Tata SIGNA series
 Tata Ultra series (ICV Segment)
 Tata Winger - (Maxivan)

Electric vehicles
Tata Motors has unveiled electric versions of the Tata Indica passenger car powered by TM4 electric motors and inverters, as well as the Tata Ace commercial vehicle, both of which run on lithium batteries which launched in 2022.

In 2008 Tata Motors' UK subsidiary, Tata Motors European Technical Centre, bought a 50.3% holding in electric vehicle technology firm Miljøbil Grenland/Innovasjon of Norway for 1.93 million, and planned to launch the electric Indica hatchback in Europe the following year. In September 2010, Tata Motors presented four CNG–Electric Hybrid low-floored Starbuses to the Delhi Transport Corporation, to be used during the 2010 Commonwealth Games. These were the first environmentally friendly buses to be used for public transportation in India.

In December 2019, Tata Motors unveiled the Nexon EV, an SUV with a 30.2KWh lithium-ion battery and a consistent range of 312 km on a single charge. It is also equipped with fast charging technology, which can charge the vehicle from 0% - 80% in 60 minutes. With 525 units of Nexon EV sold in India last month, Tata Nexon EV was the best-selling electric car in the month of April 2021 in India.

Tata Passenger Electric Mobility is a subsidiary which produces electric cars under the brand name Tata Motors.

List of Tata electric vehicles:
 Tata Nexon EV 
 Tata Tigor EV
 Tata Altroz EV
 Tata Tiago EV
 Tata Ace EV

Electric Vehicle Concepts 

 Tata Curvv
 Tata Avinya
 Tata evision

Notable vehicles

Tata Nano

The Nano was launched in 2009 as a city car intended to appeal as an affordable alternative to the section of the Indian populace that is primarily the owner of motorcycles and has not bought their first car. Initially priced at ₹100,000 (US$1,500), the vehicle attracted a lot of attention for its relatively low price. However, the Nano was very poorly rated for safety and in 2018, Cyrus Mistry, chairman of the Tata Group, called the Tata Nano a failed project, with production ending in May 2018.

Tata Ace

Tata Ace, India's first indigenously developed sub-one-ton minitruck, was launched in May 2005. The minitruck was a huge success in India with auto analysts claiming that Ace had changed the dynamics of the light commercial vehicle  (LCV) market in the country by creating a new market segment termed the small commercial vehicle  segment. Ace rapidly emerged as the first choice for transporters and single truck owners for city and rural transport.

By October 2005, LCV sales of Tata Motors had grown by 36.6% to 28,537 units due to the rising demand for Ace. The Ace was built with a load body produced by Autoline Industries.

By 2005, Autoline was producing 300 load bodies per day for Tata Motors. Ace is still a top seller for TML with 500,000 units sold by June 2010. In 2011, Tata Motors invested Rs 1000 crore in Dharwad Plant, Karnataka, with the capacity of 90,000 units annually and launched two models of 0.5-T capacity as Tata Ace Zip, Magic Iris. Ace has also been exported to several Asian, European, South American, and African countries and all-electric models are sold through Polaris Industries' Global Electric Motorcars division. In Sri Lanka, it is sold through Diesel & Motor Engineering (DIMO) PLC under the name of DIMO Batta.

Tata Prima

Tata Prima is a range of heavy trucks first introduced in 2008 as the company's 'global' truck. Tata Prima was the winner of the 'Commercial Vehicle of the Year' at the Apollo Commercial Vehicles Awards, 2010 and 2012.

Tata 407

The Tata 407 is a light commercial vehicle (LCV) that has sold over 500,000 units since its launch in 1986. In India, this vehicle dominates market share of the LCV category, accounting for close to 75% of LCV sales. The 407 model range includes trucks, tippers, pick-ups and vehicles for agri/food products, construction, light mining and services.

Tata Harrier

Tata Harrier is a 5-seater SUV that rivals the MG Hector and Jeep Compass. This car uses the engine from Fiat which is a 2.0 L-4 cylinder turbocharged diesel motor and transmission from Hyundai which is a 6-speed, available in both manual and automatic. Tata Harrier is derived from the H5X Concept displayed at the 2018 Auto Expo. It was launched on 23 January 2019.

The car is a C-segment crossover SUV based on the OmegaArc platform, an essentially re-engineered version of the Jaguar Land Rover D8 platform. A petrol variant of the Harrier is confirmed to launch in 2022-23.

Tata Harrier is also available in Nepal with the name H5.

Tata Nexon

The Tata Nexon is a subcompact crossover SUV produced by Tata Motors since 2017. It is the first crossover SUV from Tata Motors, and occupies the sub-4 metre crossover SUV segment in India. The electric version of the Nexon was revealed on 19 December 2019. The Nexon EV uses components from Tata Motors' electric vehicle technology brand Ziptron. It has a 30.2 kWh battery with an ARAI rated range of up to 312 km.

The battery can be fully charged in under 8 hours using a complimentary AC charger. It can also be charged using a 15-ampere power cable that can be used at any place with the necessary power socket. DC 25 kW fast charging can be used to charge the battery from 0 to 80% in 1 hour.

See also 
 List of companies of India
 List of largest companies by revenue
 List of corporations by market capitalisation
 Make in India
 Forbes Global 2000
 Fortune India 500
 Automotive industry in India
 Tata Revotron engine

References

External links

 

 
Car manufacturers of India
Indian brands
Bus manufacturers of India
Defence companies of India
Military vehicle manufacturers
Truck manufacturers of India
Manufacturing companies based in Mumbai
Vehicle manufacturing companies established in 1945
NIFTY 50
Car brands
Electric vehicle manufacturers of India
Indian companies established in 1945
Companies listed on the National Stock Exchange of India
Companies listed on the Bombay Stock Exchange
Companies formerly listed on the New York Stock Exchange